AEW New Year's Smash is a professional wrestling television special produced by All Elite Wrestling (AEW). Established by the promotion in 2021, the event is held annually around New Year's as a two-part event. The original January 2021 event aired as two back-to-back special episodes of AEW's flagship program, Wednesday Night Dynamite, while the second event, which aired in December 2021, occurred during the same week, first as an episode of Dynamite, then as a special episode of Friday Night Rampage, with future events retaining this format. The Dynamite broadcast for the second event was notable for being the final Dynamite to air on TNT before the show moved to TNT's sister channel TBS; Rampage remained on TNT.

History
On the December 9, 2020, episode of Wednesday Night Dynamite, All Elite Wrestling (AEW) announced that the December 30, 2020, and January 6, 2021, episodes would be a two-part event titled "New Year's Smash". However, on December 28, it was announced that the event had been postponed to January 6 and 13, 2021, due to the death of AEW wrestler Brodie Lee, with the December 30 episode instead being held as a memorial event for Lee. Night 1 of New Year's Smash aired live on January 6, while Night 2 was taped on January 7 and aired on tape delay on January 13.

On the November 19, 2021, episode of AEW's secondary program, Friday Night Rampage (which began airing in August), AEW announced New Year's Smash would return as the December 29 episode of Dynamite (the final episode of Dynamite on TNT before its move to TBS) and the New Year's Eve episode of Rampage. Dynamite aired live while Rampage aired on tape delay on December 31. This in turn established New Year's Smash as AEW's New Year's event, with future events retaining the Dynamite and Rampage broadcast format.

Events

See also
List of AEW Dynamite special episodes
List of AEW pay-per-view events

References

External links

All Elite Wrestling shows